Santa Fe Trail – Grand Pass Trail Segments are three historic Santa Fe Trail segments located at Grand Pass, Saline County, Missouri. The three trail rut segments are located within Maple Hill Cemetery and near Grand Pass Methodist Church.  They date to 1821–1827.

It was added to the National Register of Historic Places in 1994.

References

Santa Fe Trail
Roads on the National Register of Historic Places in Missouri
Buildings and structures in Saline County, Missouri
National Register of Historic Places in Saline County, Missouri